The year 1952 was the 171st year of the Rattanakosin Kingdom of Thailand. It was the 7th year in the reign of King Bhumibol Adulyadej (Rama IX), and is reckoned as year 2495 in the Buddhist Era.

Incumbents
King: Bhumibol Adulyadej
Crown Prince: (vacant)
Prime Minister: Plaek Phibunsongkhram
Supreme Patriarch: Vajirananavongs

Events

January

February

March

April

May

June

July
28 July - Queen Sirikit gives birth to a second child and only son Vajiralongkorn.

August

September

October

November

December

Births
28 July - Vajiralongkorn, Thai King

Deaths

See also
 List of Thai films of 1952

References

External links

 
Thailand
Years of the 20th century in Thailand
Thailand
1950s in Thailand